The Waterloo Warriors women's ice hockey program represents the University of Waterloo in the Ontario University Athletics women's ice hockey conference of U Sports. The current head coach is Shaun Reagan, a former competitor for the OHL's Brantford Alexanders and a selection of the Detroit Red Wings in the 1982 NHL Draft. In 2011-12, Reagan was recognized as the OUA Coach of the Year.

History
Joining the OUA conference in the 2002-03 season, having formerly been as a club team at the university, the Warriors were led by head coach Bill Antler. His coaching staff for the inaugural season included assistant coaches Roger McKenzie and Mike Cinelli. Serving as the first captain in Warriors history, Lindsay Wood played for the program until 2005, part of a foundation of competitive players including Sarah McNaught and Lindsay Wood. Finishing fourth in the OUA Western Division for their inaugural season, the club finished ahead of the Western Mustangs, who would become one of their biggest rivals. 

During their third season, the Warriors clinched their first playoff berth under interim head coach Mike Kadar. Having also served as the Strength and Conditioning Coach for the NHL’s Los Angeles Kings, Kadar joined the Warriors due to the NHL Player Lockout. Facing the Brock Badgers in their first-ever playoff series, the Warriors were unable to qualify for the next round. 

With Kadar returning to the Kings the next autumn, the 2005-2006 season featured a new head coach. Winter Games gold medalist Geraldine Heaney, a member of the Hockey Hall of Fame, took the reins, with a coaching staff that included Mike Stankowitsch, Jerry Harrigan and Bradi Cochrane. Serving as Warriors head coach from 2005-11, she stepped down from the role in May 2011.

Season-by-season Record 
{| class="wikitable"
|-
| style="background:#fea;"|Won Championship
| style="background:#dfd;"|<small>'Lost Championship</small>
| style="background:#d0e7ff;"|Conference Champions
| style="background:#fbb;"|League Leader
|-
|
|
|
|
|}

Season team scoring champion

Team captainsThis is an incomplete list''
2015-16: Kaitlyn McDonnell
2016-17: Siobhan Hewitt-Kenda

International

Awards and honours

OUA honours
Shaun Reagan: 2011-12 OUA Coach of the Year
Taytum Clairmont: 2019-20 OUA Scoring Champion
Taytum Clairmont: 2020 OUA Forward of the Year
Taytum Clairmont: 2020 OUA Most Valuable Player

OUA Rookie of the Year
Rebecca Bouwhuis: 2011-12
Rachel Marriott: 2013-14
Stephanie Sluys: 2014-15

OUA All-Stars
Taytum Clairmont: 2019-20 OUA First Team All-Star

OUA All-Rookie
Rebecca Bouwhuis: 2011-12 OUA All-Rookie Team
Rachel Marriott: 2013-14 OUA All-Rookie Team
Stephanie Sluys: 2014-15 OUA All-Rookie Team
Mikayla Schnarr: 2019-20 OUA All-Rookie Team

USports honours
Taytum Clairmont, U SPORTS Female Athlete of the Month in November 2019

All-Canadian
Taytum Clairmont: 2020 U SPORTS second-team All-Canadian

USports All-Rookie
Rebecca Bouwhuis: 2011-12 USports All-Rookie

Warriors in professional hockey

References

External links
 

 U Sports women's ice hockey teams
Women's ice hockey teams in Canada
Ice hockey teams in Ontario
Women in Ontario